The administrative division of Yemen consists of two main divisions (governorates and districts). There are 22 governorates, including the capital Sana'a (Amanat Al Asima) and Socotra Archipelago. The 22 governorates are then divided into 333 districts, subdivided into 2,210 sub-districts, and then into 38,284 villages (as of 2001).  

Throughout history, Yemen has been divided into several administrative divisions. In the Ottoman era, the Yemen Vilayet (from Arabic ولاية wilayah) was divided into sanjaks (also called livas). Sanjaks were further subdivided into kazas. During the reign of the Mutawakkillite Kingdom of Yemen, some of the elements were integrated into a new division. These divisions were also used by the later Yemen Arab Republic with minor adjustments.

According to the outputs of the Yemeni National Dialogue Conference, Yemen was expected to be divided in late 2014 into six provinces: 'Azal,  Al-Janad, Tihama, Hadhramaut, Saba, and Aden.

Administrative divisions
There are two main administrative divisions in Yemen: governorates and districts.
 Governorates (Arabic: محافظة ) are the highest administrative division in Yemen. Yemen is divided into twenty-one governorates and one municipality. 
 Districts (Arabic: مديرية ) are the second administrative division in Yemen. Each governorate in Yemen is split into a number of districts for a total of 333 districts in Yemen.
The remaining administrative divisions are separate for urban and rural areas.

Administrative divisions in urban areas are as follows.
 Cities (Arabic: مدن ) are an administrative division in Yemen, defined as being the seats of governorates and/or districts. They tend to have a substantial population and a variety of services.
 Neighborhoods (Arabic: حي ) are the fourth-level administrative division in Yemen's urban areas. It consists of multiple adjacent blocks, the amount varying from neighborhood to neighborhood.
 Blocks (Arabic: حارة ) are the lowest-level administrative division in urban areas. They are defined as groups of adjacent buildings surrounded by a group of streets to separate them from other blocks.
Administrative divisions in rural areas are as follows.
'Uzal (Arabic: عزلة ) are the next-level administrative division following districts in Yemen's rural areas. They are filled with villages. There are about 2,210 'uzal in Yemen.
 Villages (Arabic: قرية ) are a fourth-level administrative division in Yemen. They are clustered settlements, similar to towns. They may range in size from only a couple houses to sizable communities. They also typically include shops and fields for agriculture. There are roughly 40,000 villages in Yemen.

List of the divisions of Yemen

1) Soqatra Governorate created in December 2013 from parts of Hadramaut, data included there

Historical subdivisions
Yemen became a unified country in May 1990 after the merger of the northern "Yemen Arab Republic" (North Yemen) and the southern "People's Democratic Republic of Yemen" (South Yemen).

Governorates of South Yemen

Following independence, South Yemen was divided into six governorates (Arabic: muhafazat), with roughly natural boundaries, each given a Roman numeral.

Provinces of North Yemen
Until 1980, North Yemen was split into governorates. In 1980, the country was reorganized into eight provinces (Arabic: liwa).

References

 
Yemen 1